The Bombardier 4.8 is a Canadian sailing dinghy that was designed by Bombardier Research as a day sailer and first built in 1982.

Production
The design was built by Bombardier Limited in Canada, but it is now out of production.

Design
The Bombardier 4.8 is a recreational sailboat, built predominantly of fibreglass, with polyurethane flotation and aluminum spars. It has a fractional sloop rig, a raked stem, a vertical transom, a flip-up, transom-hung rudder controlled by a tiller and a flip-up centreboard keel. It displaces  and can accommodate four people.

The design features an adjustable outhaul, boom vang, Cunningham and a roller furling genoa. It is also fitted with adjustable hiking straps. There is a small stowage compartment in the bow.

The design employs a vacuum cockpit self-bailer that can be left open when the boat is stationary.

See also
List of sailing boat types

Similar sailboats
Catalina 16.5
Wayfarer (dinghy)
DS-16
Nordica 16
Tanzer 16

References

Dinghies
1980s sailboat type designs
Sailing yachts
Sailboat type designs by Bombardier Research
Sailboat types built by Bombardier Limited